Lopat may refer to:

Eddie Lopat, Major League Baseball pitcher
Lopatcong Township, New Jersey, a township in Warren County